Bank Mizrahi-Tefahot is the third-largest bank in Israel. It has around 140 branches. The bank is the largest among Israel's mortgage lenders.

History
Bank Mizrahi-Tefahot was formed by a merger of Bank Mizrahi HaMeuhad and Bank Tefahot in 2004.

Bank Mizrahi was established in 1923 by the Mizrachi movement and later merged with Bank Hapoel HaMizrachi to form Bank Mizrahi HaMeuhad (United Mizrachi Bank).

In November 2017, Mizrahi Tehafot Bank agreed to buy Union Bank of Israel for US$400 million, thereby consolidating its position as the third largest Israeli bank.
	
On 12 February 2020, Bank Mizrahi-Tefahot was listed on a database of 112 companies compiled by the United Nations implicated in helping  to further Israeli settlement activity in the West Bank and Golan Heights,  an activity considered illegal under international law.

On 5 July 2021, Norway's largest pension fund KLP said it would divest from Bank Mizrahi-Tefahot, alongside 15 other business entities implicated in the report, over the UN's fingering of what it asserted were "banking and financial operations helping to develop, expand or maintain settlements and their activities" in the occupied territories.

See also

Banking in Israel
List of companies operating in West Bank settlements

References

External links
Bank website

Banks of Israel
Banks established in 1923
1923 establishments in Mandatory Palestine
Companies listed on the Tel Aviv Stock Exchange